Wasted! (Dutch: Naar de Klote!)  is a 1996 Dutch drama film directed by Aryan Kaganof. It is the first film depicting the Electronic Music Scene in the Netherlands.

The film was made during the time when the Dutch gabber scene was at its highpoint. The same was true for the recreational use of ecstasy by Dutch youngsters at such parties.

Plot 

Two teenagers in love go to the big city (Amsterdam) and wind up in the house and trance scene. The boy ends up spending his days smoking marijuana; the girl is introduced to ecstasy and runs into the drug underworld by selling the substance. At some point in the film, they lose contact and seek to be reunited.

Title 
The title of the film comes from the hit Alles naar de Klote (Everything Wasted!) of the Rotterdam hardcore band De Euromasters.

The film introduces an electronic music score with tracks by Party Animals, Flamman & Abraxas and Deepzone.

Cast 
Fem van der Elzen as Jacqueline
Tygo Gernandt as Martijn
Thom Hoffman as DJ Cowboy
Hugo Metsers as JP
Mike Libanon as Winston

External links 
 

1996 films
1990s Dutch-language films
Dutch drama films
Dutch rock music films
Electronic music films
1996 drama films